The Lawson L-2 was a 1920s American biplane airliner, designed and built by the Lawson Air Line Company of Milwaukee, Wisconsin.

Design and development

 
The Lawson Air Line Company designed and built a series of large biplane airliners for use on its planned airline routes. The initial Lawson "Aerial Transport" Lawson C1 or T-1 was built early in 1919 to demonstrate that a large commercial passenger plane could be built. The L-1 was a single pilot, 10 passenger biplane with twin Liberty 400 hp pusher engines. It was followed by the Lawson C.2 or L-2. The L-2 was a tractor biplane also with 400 hp engines, capable of carrying 26 passengers, and piloted by two pilots, with differential controls.

Mr. Lawson took it on a 2000-mile multi-city tour to advocate commercial air travel.

Some sources state Mr. Lawson himself as the sole designer; others mention involvement of Vincent Burnelli.

Operators

Lawson Airline Company

Specifications (L-2)

See also

References

External links

 Contemporary technical description of the Lawson C-1 and C-2 (early versions of the L-2) with scale drawings of the C-1 and photographs of the C-2.

1920s United States airliners
L-2
Biplanes
Aircraft first flown in 1920
Twin piston-engined tractor aircraft